The Pashisa class (パシサ) locomotives were a group of steam tender locomotives of the Chosen Government Railway (Sentetsu) with 4-6-2 wheel arrangement. The "Pashi" name came from the American naming system for steam locomotives, under which locomotives with 4-6-2 wheel arrangement were called "Pacific".

In all, Sentetsu owned 144 locomotives of all Pashi classes, of which 141 survived the war; of these, 73 went to the Korean National Railroad in South Korea and 68 to the Korean State Railway in North Korea.

Description
Along with the six Pashii copies built by Kisha Seizō, 1923 saw the delivery of another six similar locomotives from Kawasaki of Japan, the パシサ (Pashisa) class. Originally numbered パシ957–パシ962, they became パシサ1–パシサ6 in Sentetsu's general renumbering of 1938. The success of these engines and the Japanese-built Pashii copies proved that domestic (i.e. Japanese, Manchurian and Korean) industry was more than capable of building satisfactory locomotives, and signalled the end of the importation of locomotives from foreign sources.

Postwar
The exact dispersal of the Pashisa-class locomotives between North and South after the partition of Korea is uncertain, but it was likely an even split.

Korean National Railroad 파시3 (Pasi3) class
The Korean National Railroad likely received three of the six Pashisa-class locomotives; the identies of two are known for certain. They were designated 파시3 (Pasi3) class, and were used by the KNR on passenger trains until the end of the 1960s.

Korean State Railway 바시서 (Pasisŏ) class
The Korean State Railway is believed to have received three of the six Pashisa-class locomotives. Little of their service lives is known, but they were initially designated 바시서 (Pasisŏ) class, and they were likely retired by the end of the 1960s.

Construction

References

Locomotives of Korea
Locomotives of South Korea
Locomotives of North Korea
Railway locomotives introduced in 1923
4-6-2 locomotives
Kawasaki locomotives